John Samuel Foster (19 November 1877 – 5 February 1946) was an English footballer who played as a forward for various clubs in the 1900s. After retiring as a player, he became a manager.

Playing career
Foster was born in Rawmarsh, West Riding of Yorkshire, but started his professional career as an inside-forward at Blackpool of the Football League Second Division, where, during the 1901–02 season, he scored six goals from 28 league appearances. He then dropped down to the Midland League where he spent several seasons back in Yorkshire with Rotherham Town before moving to Southern League Watford in 1906. At Watford, he developed a reputation as a "dashing leader of attacking football".

He returned to the Football League when he joined Sunderland of the First Division in December 1907 for a fee of £800. He made his first-team debut on 7 December, playing at centre-forward when he scored in a 2–0 victory at Birmingham. Foster retained his place for the next six matches, scoring twice in a 5–2 victory over Woolwich Arsenal on New Year's Day, before losing his place to Angus McIntosh. His time at Roker Park coincided with a decline in his health, and his doctor advised him to move to a milder climate in the south.

Foster joined West Ham United of the Southern League in May 1908, where his form returned, scoring nine goals in 15 outings, including a hat-trick in a 3–1 victory over Portsmouth on 10 October 1908. In March 1909, he moved again, to join Southampton in an exchange deal with Frank Costello.

Foster's career at The Dell started badly as he missed some easy chances and after only six matches, when he scored once, he lost his place to Bob Carter, who had also joined the club recently. At the end of the season, he was on the move again to join Huddersfield Town, playing their last season in the Midland League and was their top goal scorer with 25 goals.

Foster left Huddersfield in the 1910 close season, and dropped down to non-league football with Castleford and Morley, while working as a chimney sweep, before returning to Huddersfield as assistant trainer in 1912.

Managerial career
From August 1926, Foster was assistant manager at Bradford City under Colin Veitch. He succeeded Veitch in January 1928 as caretaker manager for the final four months of the 1927–28 season. He finished sixth in Division Three (North), just seven points shy of promotion before handing over to Peter O'Rourke.

Foster finished his football related career as a scout for Portsmouth in 1938.

References

Bibliography

1877 births
1946 deaths
Footballers from Rotherham
English footballers
English Football League players
Southern Football League players
Blackpool F.C. players
Rotherham Town F.C. (1899) players
Watford F.C. players
Sunderland A.F.C. players
West Ham United F.C. players
Southampton F.C. players
Huddersfield Town A.F.C. players
English football managers
Bradford City A.F.C. managers
Castleford Town F.C. players
Huddersfield Town A.F.C. non-playing staff
Association football forwards